The 1995 FIBA European Championship for Cadettes was the 11th edition of the European basketball championship for U16 women's teams, today known as FIBA U16 Women's European Championship. 12 teams featured in the competition, held in Wladyslawowo, Poland, from 29 July to 6 August 1995.

Russia won their second title in a row in their second appearance after the dissolution of the Soviet Union in 1991.

Qualification
For the first time since the inception of the tournament, a qualification round was played. Nineteen countries entered the qualification round. They were divide in three groups. The top three teams of each group qualified for the main tournament.

Poland (as host), Russia (as incumbent champion) and Spain (as incumbent runner-up) received a bye to the main tournament and did not play in the qualification round.

Group A
The games were played in Espoo, Finland, from August 10 to 14, 1994.

Group B
The games were played in Marsala, Italy, from August 8 to 14, 1994.

Group C
The games were played in Žilina, Slovakia, from August 10 to 14, 1994.

Qualified teams
The following twelve teams qualified for the final tournament.

Preliminary round
In the Preliminary Round, the twelve teams were allocated in two groups of six teams each. The top two teams of each group advanced to the semifinals. The third and fourth place of each group qualified for the 5th-8th playoffs. The last two teams of each group qualified for the 9th-12th playoffs.

Group A

Group B

Playoffs

9th-12th playoff

5th-8th playoff

Championship playoff

Final standings

Statistical leaders

Points

Rebounds

Assists

Notes

References

External links
Official Site

1995
1995–96 in European women's basketball
1995 in Polish sport
International youth basketball competitions hosted by Poland
International women's basketball competitions hosted by Poland